Paper Mate is a division of Sanford L.P., a Newell Brands company that produces writing instruments. Paper Mate's offices are located in Oak Brook, Illinois, along with those of Newell Rubbermaid's other office products divisions.

Its product line includes ballpoint and gel pens, mechanical pencils and wooden pencils, erasers, and correction fluids.

History
Early in 1941, Patrick J. Frawley acquired his first company, a ballpoint pen parts manufacturer that had defaulted on its loan. In 1949, The Frawley Pen Company developed an ink which dried instantly. The pen that delivered this ink was called "The Paper Mate".

In 1955, the Frawley Pen Company was acquired by The Gillette Company, Inc. for $15.5 million, and formed the basis for the Paper Mate Division of Gillette. Twenty-five years later (1980), Gillette acquired Liquid Paper and Waterman; with these acquisitions, the Paper Mate Division was changed to the Stationery Products Group. In late 2000, Gillette's stationery products division was purchased by Newell Rubbermaid and merged with Newell Rubbermaid's Sanford Brands division. As an employee of PaperMate, Norman Holtzman designed the double heart logo over 50 years ago, and it is still the PaperMate identity in 2021.

Products

Paper Mate products are offered in a variety of colors and shapes.

In 1979, Paper Mate introduced the Eraser Mate or Erasermate brand.

In the 1980s, Paper Mate invented the Replay 2000 pen, with erasable ink and a rubber at one end.

In 2010, Paper Mate introduced "environmentally friendly" biodegradable pens, pencils and erasers.

In 2012, Paper Mate introduced the brand InkJoy.

References

External links
 
 The Gillette Company at Encyclopedia.com: Paper Mate as part of Gillette (1955 to 2000)

Newell Brands
Stationery
Pen manufacturers
Pencil brands
American companies established in 1940
Manufacturing companies established in 1940
2000 mergers and acquisitions